Two vessels of the Royal Navy have been named HMS Seraph:

 , an  launched in 1918 and sold in 1934.
 , an S-class submarine launched in 1941. She served in World War II and was broken up in 1965.

References
 

Royal Navy ship names